Iva Dale Pickett Gay (June 25, 1891 - 1988) was a Wyoming clubwoman and one of the best known women of her time in the oil business.

Early life and family

Iva Dale Pickett was born in Rockford, Iowa, on June 25, 1891, the daughter of John Robert Pickett/Pigott (1858/1859-1911), Sheriff of Lyman County, South Dakota, and Sarah Climena Smith (1862-1928).

She had 3 siblings:  Pearl Alma (1881-1973, married Bowen),  Genevieve "Jenny" Grace (1883-1942/1943, married Blatt),  Charles Dwight (1903-1975).

John Robert Pickett was the son of John Vickers Pigott (1825-1881), born in Ireland and arrived in New York, aged 11, in 1837 on the ship Independence from Liverpool.

Sara Climena Smith descended from James Hinman from Vermont, ascending line: Jane Augusta Hinman, John, James.

Career
Dale Pickett Gay was the President of Wyoming Federation of Women's Clubs and she was active in all club work; she was interested in American Red Cross work and Child Health Conferences. 

She was a member of: Casper Departmental Club, Casper Woman's Club, Daughters of the American Revolution. 

She was the treasurer of the Coal and Grass Creek Oil Company. The company controlled 1120 acres in the famous Wyoming Oil Fields.

Personal life
Dale Pickett Gay moved to Wyoming in 1911 and lived at 612 South Park Street, Casper, Wyoming.

On September 2, 1915, in Denver, Colorado, Dale Pickett married Guy J. Gay (1886-1946), an Insurance salesman in Seattle, Washington, and they had 4 daughters: Geraldine (1918-1991), Genevieve (1919-1999), Betty Ann, Helen Eileen (b. 1924). 

She died in 1988.

References

1891 births
1988 deaths
Daughters of the American Revolution people
People from Floyd County, Iowa
Clubwomen